Pseudobaeomyces is a genus of lichenized fungi in the Icmadophilaceae family. It is monotypic, containing the single species Pseudobaeomyces insignis, found in Asia.

References

Lichens of Asia
Monotypic Lecanoromycetes genera
Lichen genera
Pertusariales
Taxa described in 1940